The 2020–21 California Golden Bears women's basketball team represented University of California, Berkeley during the 2020–21 NCAA Division I women's basketball season.  The Golden Bears, led by second year head coach Charmin Smith, played their home games at the Haas Pavilion as members of the Pac-12 Conference.

Previous season 
The Golden Bears finished the season 12–19, 3–15 in Pac-12 play to finish in twelfth place. They advanced to the Quarterfinals of the Pac-12 women's tournament where they lost to Arizona.  The NCAA tournament and WNIT were cancelled due to the COVID-19 pandemic.

Roster

Schedule
Source:

|-
!colspan=9 style=| Regular Season

|-
!colspan=9 style=| Pac-12 Women's Tournament

Rankings

Coaches did not release a Week 2 poll and AP does not release a poll after the NCAA Tournament.

See also
2020–21 California Golden Bears men's basketball team

References

California Golden Bears women's basketball seasons
California
Golden Bears
Golden Bears